Old Oyo National Park is one of the national parks of Nigeria, located across northern Oyo State and southern Kwara State, Nigeria.
The park is 2,512 km2 of land in northern Oyo state, south west Nigeria, at latitude 8° 15’ and 9° 00’N and longitude 3° 35’ and 4° 42’ E. The location has inevitably placed the park at a vantage position of abundance land area as well as diverse wildlife and cultural/historical settings. Eleven local government areas out of which ten fall within Oyo State and one in Kwara State surround it. The Administrative Head Office is located in Oyo, Isokun area along Oyo-Iseyin road, where necessary information and booking could be made. The landscaping and organized space within the large yard has made the facility very endearing to the public.
It is rich in plant and animal resources including buffaloes, bushbuck and a variety of birds. The park is easily accessible from southwestern and northwestern Nigeria. The nearest cities and towns adjoining Old Oyo National Park include Saki, Iseyin, Igboho, Sepeteri, Tede, Kishi and Igbeti which have their own commercial and cultural attractions for tourism.

History
The park takes its name from Oyo-lle (Old Oyo), the ancient political capital of Oyo Empire of the Yoruba people, and contains the ruins of this city. 
The national park originated in two earlier native administrative forest reserves, Upper Ogun established in 1936 and Oyo-lle established in 1941. These were converted to game reserves in 1952, then combined and upgraded to the present status of a national park.

Environment
The park covers 2,512 km2, mostly of lowland plains at a height of 330 m and 508 m above sea level. The southern part is drained by the Owu, Owe and Ogun Rivers, while the northern sector is drained by the Tessi River. Outcrops of granite are typical of the north eastern zone of the park, including at Oyo-lle, with caves and rock shelters in the extreme north.
 
The central part of the park has scattered hills, ridges and rock outcrops that are suitable for mountaineering.
 
The Ikere Gorge Dam on the Ogun river provides water recreation facilities for tourists.

Flora and fauna
The Old Oyo National Park was previously habitat for the endangered West African wild dog (Lycaon pictus manguensis). However none now exist in the park due to hunting pressure and the expanding human population in the region.

References

National parks of Nigeria
Oyo State
Kwara State
World Heritage Sites in Nigeria
1936 establishments in the British Empire